Oswald Curtis (1821 – 1 March 1902) was a 19th-century New Zealand politician born in London, England, on 20 January 1821. He was the son of Stephen Curtis and Eleanora Llewellyn. He migrated to Nelson in 1853, arriving on 18 June.

Mahomed Shah 
Curtis had been a passenger on the barque Mahomed Shah. The ship sailed from England for New Zealand on 15 January 1853. On 18 April, about 400 miles south of Cape Leeuwin, the ship caught fire. All on board were rescued two days later by the brig The Ellen under Captain Pardon. The Ellen was sailing from Mauritius to Hobart. Those rescued were taken to Hobart, arriving there on 6 May 1853.

Political career 

He was a member of the Nelson Provincial Council from 1857 to 1867, becoming its Superintendent in March 1867 when Alfred Saunders resigned. He remained Superintendent until 1876 when the Provinces were abolished. During his term as a member of Parliament, for one month between 10 September and 11 October 1872 Curtis was Commissioner of Stamps and Customs, Post-Master General and Telegraphs Commissioner under the short lived third Stafford Ministry.

As Superintendent, Curtis opened the Nelson Waterworks on 16 April 1868 and turned the first sod at Stoke for the cutting of the Nelson-Foxhill Railway on 6 May 1873.

Community service 
Curtis had been, at various times, Magistrate, Warden, Coroner, College Governor at Nelson. He was also Fellow of the New Zealand University and held a seat on its senate from 1870 to 1888.

Curtis was also the second President of the Nelson Chamber of Commerce, succeeding Alfred Fell (father of Charles Fell).

He died at his residence 'Highbury' in Nelson on 1 March 1902 aged 81.

Notes

References

|-

|-

|-

1821 births
1902 deaths
Superintendents of New Zealand provincial councils
Members of the New Zealand House of Representatives
Members of the Nelson Provincial Council
Unsuccessful candidates in the 1879 New Zealand general election
New Zealand MPs for South Island electorates
People from London
English emigrants to New Zealand
19th-century New Zealand politicians